Ring finger and CCCH-type domains 1, also known as Roquin-1, is a protein that in humans is encoded by the RC3H1 gene.

Function 

This gene encodes a protein containing RING-type and C3H1-type zinc finger motifs. The encoded protein recognizes and binds to a constitutive decay element (CDE) in the 3' UTR of mRNAs, leading to mRNA deadenylation and degradation. Alternative splicing results in multiple transcript variants. [provided by RefSeq, Jul 2014].

References

Further reading